Goertek Inc. (was stylized as GoerTek) is a Chinese acoustic components company, listed on the Shenzhen Stock Exchange in May 2008.  The company claims to hold the largest market value among acoustic companies on the Shenzhen Stock Exchange.  Goertek's main focuses consist of R&D, production and sales of electro-acoustic components, optical components, electronic accessories and related products.

GoerTek's customers include Samsung, Apple, Sony and Lenovo, and the company was founded in June 2001 by the billionaire entrepreneur Jiang Bin and his wife Hu Shuangmei. His brother, Jiang Long, is vice chairman.

In 2014, Goertek bought a majority share of Danish loudspeaker manufacturer Dynaudio.

Global network 
The global headquarters of Goertek is in Weifang, and there are regional headquarters in Beijing, East China, South China, Taiwan, Japan, Europe and the Americas.

References

Companies listed on the Shenzhen Stock Exchange
Electronics companies of China
Companies based in Shandong
Chinese brands
Electronics companies established in 2001
Chinese companies established in 2001